The 2021 Big Machine Music City Grand Prix was an IndyCar motor race held on August 8, 2021 at the Nashville Street Circuit in Nashville, Tennessee. It was the eleventh round of the 2021 IndyCar Series and the first ever edition of the Music City Grand Prix. 

The race lasted for 80 laps and was won by Marcus Ericsson of Chip Ganassi Racing, scoring his second win of the season.

Background 
In September 2020, IndyCar announced that the series will add a street race in downtown Nashville, Tennessee for the 2021 season. 

The inaugural event was held on the weekend of August 6-8, 2021 at the newly created Nashville Street Circuit. It was the eleventh race of the 2021 season, marking the conclusion of the midseason summer break, which started following the Honda Indy 200 at Mid-Ohio. During the race weekend, the GT America series, the Trans-Am Series TA2 class, and the Stadium Super Trucks also competed as support series for the race.

This is the first of the two Big Machine-sponsored races in the 2021 season, the other being the following race, the Big Machine Spiked Coolers Grand Prix at the Indianapolis Motor Speedway.

Championship standings before the race 
Chip Ganassi Racing's Álex Palou retained his lead in the driver's standings following his third-result at Mid-Ohio, over Pato O'Ward of Arrow McLaren SP and teammate Scott Dixon in second and third respectively. Mid-Ohio race winner Josef Newgarden of Team Penske remained fourth, while Ganassi driver Marcus Ericsson moved up to fifth, thanks to his second-place finish at the previous race.

Honda extended their lead over Chevrolet to 73 points after four Honda drivers finished in the top five at Mid-Ohio.

Entrants

Practice

Practice 1 
Practice 1 took place at 4:10 PM ET on August 6, 2021. The session was interrupted 22 minutes in by an accident involving Pato O'Ward, who clipped the wall in Turn 3 and crashed into the barrier on the opposite side. O'Ward was able to leave his damaged car uninjured. Another incident involving Conor Daly occurred towards the end of the session, as his car slid into the tire barrier after exiting the bridge section. Daly climbed out of his damaged car unharmed. Colton Herta topped the first ever practice session held at the Streets of Nashville with a time of 01:16.5875, besting Scott Dixon and rookie Romain Grosjean in second and third.

Practice 2 
Practice 2 took place at 1:00 PM ET on August 7, 2021. With six minutes remaining in the session, Alexander Rossi made contact with the concrete wall in Turn 10, dislodging his front wing and sending it under his car, causing suspension damage. Colton Herta went fastest for the second time in the weekend with a time of 01:15.3529, ahead of Andretti Autosport teammate Rossi in second and Scott Dixon in third.

Qualifying 
Qualifying took place at 4:30 PM ET on August 7, 2021. 

In Round 1, Jimmie Johnson, who was sorted into the first group, experienced a heavy crash in Turn 10, wrecking his No. 48 Carvana Honda. This left Johnson unable to set a time in the session and reduced qualifying time for the other 12 drivers in the group, who only had three minutes and 20 seconds to set a lap.

During the final seconds of the Fast 12, Josef Newgarden crashed into the wall in Turn 11, causing major damage to the right side of his car. The incident also triggered a local yellow, hindering the laps of other drivers, which led to Newgarden losing his fastest lap, demoting him to last in the session and promoting Romain Grosjean into the Firestone Fast Six.

Colton Herta qualified first and took the first ever pole position of the Music City Grand Prix, with a time of 01:13.6835 and a gap of nearly six-tenths over Scott Dixon, who went second fastest. Championship leader Álex Palou finished third fastest, but would start the race ninth, as a result of a grid penalty given after an unapproved engine change.

Qualifying classification 

 Notes
 Bold text indicates fastest time set in session.
  - Álex Palou received a nine-place grid penalty following an unapproved engine change during a test at the Portland International Raceway a week prior to the race.

Race

Race report 
The race started at 5:30 pm ET on August 8, 2021. As a result of his accident during qualifying, Jimmie Johnson started with a NTT Data-liveried car, as his No. 48 Carvana Honda was deemed too damaged to be used for the race. The first lap went underway with a rolling start on the Korean War Veterans Memorial Bridge and saw no incidents occur, with polesitter Colton Herta leading the race.

First, second, and third caution 
On lap 2, Dalton Kellett stalled his car on the Front Straight, bringing out the first caution of the day, to allow his car to be restarted. The caution lasted two laps. Moments before the race returned to green flag conditions on lap 4, Marcus Ericsson crashed into the rear of Sebastién Bourdais' car, briefly sending Ericsson airborne, causing terminal damage to Bourdais' car, forcing him to end his race prematurely. This incident caused a four-lap caution period, lasting until lap 8. Ericsson's car was left mostly unscathed, apart from a heavily damaged front wing, which was promptly replaced in a pit stop. Ericsson was forced to restart from the back of the grid due to emergency service in a closed pit, and also received a stop-and-go penalty for the incident with Bourdais.

On lap 16, Ed Jones made light contact with Scott McLaughlin in Turn 4, which led to McLaughlin losing control of his car and becoming momentarily stationary, triggering the third caution of the race, which lasted three laps. Jones was later given with a drive-through penalty for avoidable contact.

Fourth caution and first red flag 
Shortly after the race was green flagged again on lap 20, another caution was brought on, as drivers attempted to overtake in the narrow section leading up to Turn 11. Will Power overtook Simon Pagenaud, whilst making contact, which caused Pagenaud to crash into the wall in Turn 11. Santino Ferrucci brushed the rear of Pagenaud's car, but was able to continue, along with Power. Rinus VeeKay, who was on the outside of Pagenaud, ended up in the wall next to the Penske driver. Takuma Sato was unable to avoid VeeKay and Pagenaud and was forced to stop behind both drivers, also making contact with the rears of both cars. Behind Sato was Jimmie Johnson, facing the wrong direction after being spun by Cody Ware, who lost his front wing in the process and also came to a halt. Johnson was also hit by teammate Álex Palou, who was also unable to stop in time. This culminated in a bottleneck in Turn 11, forcing James Hinchcliffe, Ryan Hunter-Reay, Josef Newgarden, Conor Daly, and Hélio Castroneves to a halt.

A two-lap caution period was first brought out on lap 20. Afterwards, the race was red flagged as stewards cleared the blockage on track, with Herta still in the lead. During the stoppage, Johnson was disqualified from the race after his team illegally worked on his car under the red flag conditions.

Fifth caution 
On lap 31, VeeKay crashed into the wall and stalled his car near pit exit, prompting the fifth caution of the race to be brought on. During the caution, Herta made a pit stop from the lead and emerged fourth, with Ericsson, who had been relegated to last earlier in the race, in the lead. The caution lasted five laps. 

By lap 38, Herta had overtaken Hinchcliffe and Hunter-Reay to climb back to second place, behind Ericsson.

Sixth, seventh, and eighth caution 
On lap 41, Power nudged teammate McLaughlin into a spin in Turn 9. Kellett crashed in the wall shortly after the exit of Turn 9, after failing to avoid McLaughlin, who was sideways and stationary near the middle of the track. This caused another caution to be triggered, which lasted nine laps, making it the longest caution period of the race. Power was subsequently awarded a drive-through penalty for avoidable contact. During this caution period, Ericsson pitted, handing the lead to Herta on lap 45.

On lap 51, Pato O'Ward made contact with Alexander Rossi as O'Ward attempted an overtake on Rossi in Turn 4, which ended with O'Ward hitting the tire barriers and both drivers briefly stationary. This caused the seventh caution of the race, which lasted two laps. O'Ward was consequently given a stop-and-go penalty for failure to yield to safety and a drive-through penalty for avoidable contact. 

On lap 55, Ware spun and stalled in Turn 3, triggering the eighth caution of the race, lasting two laps. Ware would later be disqualified from the race for failure to participate at competitive speed.

Romain Grosjean briefly held the lead for four laps from lap 52, after Herta made his pit stop. Grosjean then relinquished his lead to Ericsson after making his pit stop.

On lap 68, Grosjean made slight contact with Pagenaud, which sent Pagenaud into the wall, resulting in damage to the Pagenaud's suspension, which caused the Penske driver to retire from the race. Grosjean was then penalized with a drive-through penalty for avoidable contact.

Ninth caution and second red flag 
Herta, who was just over a second behind race leader Ericsson at the time, crashed heavily into the barriers in Turn 9 on lap 75, after his tires locked up during corner entry. His No. 26 Gainbridge Honda car was terminally damaged, effectively ending his fight for the win. The crash triggered the ninth and final caution of the race, which lasted three laps. The second red flag of the day was then triggered to repair the damaged tire barrier and extract the wrecked car from the track.

Finish 
The race returned to green flag conditions on lap 78. Ericsson took victory in the inaugural event despite his incident early in the race, with Chip Ganassi Racing teammate Scott Dixon finishing second. Hinchcliffe completed the podium places with his third place finish. Despite his crash, Herta led the most laps of the race. In total, the race had nine caution periods and two red flag, resulting in a total of 33 of the event's 80 laps run under caution conditions. It also saw two drivers, Johnson and Ware, disqualified from the race.

Race classification 

 Notes
  - Cody Ware was disqualified for failing to participate at competitive speed.
  - Jimmie Johnson was disqualified due to unapproved work on car under red flag conditions.

Championship standings after the race 
Álex Palou maintained his lead of the championship. Scott Dixon was promoted to second, following his second place finish. Pato O'Ward was relegated to third, after only managing to finish 13th. Race winner Marcus Ericsson narrowed the gap to fourth-placed Josef Newgarden to four points.

Drivers' Championship standings

Engine manufacturer standings

 Note: Only the top five positions are included.

References

External links
 

Big Machine Music City Grand Prix
Big Machine Music City Grand Prix
Big Machine Music City Grand Prix
Big Machine Music City Grand Prix